This is a list of high-profile people accused of bribery in Russia.

On November 14, 2016, Alexey Ulyukaev, Minister for Economic Development, was  arrested by Investigative Committee, allegedly for receiving a bribe of 2,000,000 US Dollars.  he was under investigation and could be facing up to 15 years of jail time if proven guilty.
On June 24, 2016, Nikita Belykh, governor of Perm Oblast, was  arrested in a bar by Russian Investigative Committee, allegedly for receiving a bribe of 400,000 Euros.  he was  under investigation and could be facing up to 15 years of jail time if proven guilty.
2015, Andrey Lyalin (Андрей Лялин) director of Russian Central Naval Museum,
2013: Aleksandr Bukhtoyarov, former first deputy governor of Kurgan Oblast.
2013: Vyacheslav Dudka, 9.5 years of penal colony, former governor of Tula Oblast
2012: Yuri Sleptsov, former mayor of Voskresensk, Moscow Oblast, 18.1 million rouble fine 
2011: Anatoli Bashlakov, former chief of Plesetsk Cosmodrome
2011: Eduard Kachanovsky, former mayor of Smolensk, 4 years and fine
2010: Sergey Tulinov, former head of Yeysky District, 7.5 years
2009: Natalya Klimova, former deputy director of the Federal Compulsory Medical Insurance Fund, 9 years of penal colony, died in 2015
2008: Nikolay Utkin, former mayor of Tolyatti, 7 years, released on probation ahead of time in 2012 
2006: Vladimir Ganeyev, former Lieutenant-General of the Ministry of Emergency Situations", Case of Verevolves with Epaulettes; 20 years, released in 2014 due to health
2001: Valentin Kovalyov, former Minister of Justice, 9 years

See also

Combating Corruption
Corruption in Russia
Alexander Khoroshavin
Vyacheslav Gayzer

References

 
Lists of criminals
People accused of bribery